Dalworthington Gardens is a city in Tarrant County, Texas, United States and a suburb of Arlington. Its population was 2,259 at the 2010 census.

History
The community was established in 1934 as a subsistence homestead project during the Great Depression under the authority of the National Industrial Recovery Act as part of the Subsistence Homesteads Division. The purpose of the homestead program was to help families attain a better standard of living through a combination of part-time industrial employment and subsistence agriculture. Dalworthington Gardens was one of five such projects located in Texas. Its inclusion the in group was at the suggestion of Eleanor Roosevelt, who happened upon the area while visiting the Fort Worth family of the woman to whom President Roosevelt and her son Elliot had become engaged. Of the five sites selected for this program, Dalworthington "colony" as it was originally called, is the only one still in existence today. Since it has been in constant operation from its inception, it maintains its original zoning regulations, which allow subsistence farming and livestock on any lots over one-half acre that remain owned and occupied from the time the zoning was first put into effect. Thus, one can see small, older frame homes with livestock on their lot, near and even adjacent to large modern homes with values in excess of $1 million. The community's name is a portmanteau of the names of the three anchor cities of the metroplex:  Dallas, Fort Worth, and Arlington.

Geography

Dalworthington Gardens is located at  (32.696633, –97.155705).

The town's northern border adjoins Pantego; both towns are completely surrounded by the city of Arlington.

Demographics

2020 census

As of the 2020 United States census, 2,293 people, 789 households, and 657 families resided in the city.

2000 census
As of the census of 2000, 2,186 people, 747 households, and 622 families were residing in the city. The population density was 1,193.8 people per square mile (461.2/km2). The 765 housing units had an average density of 417.8 per square mile (161.4/km2). The racial makeup of the city was 89.52% White, 6.08% African American, 0.50% Native American, 1.56% Asian, 0.46% from other races, and 1.88% from two or more races. Hispanics or Latinos of any race were 3.80% of the population.

Of the 747 households, 41.2% had children under 18 living with them, 73.5% were married couples living together, 7.9% had a female householder with no husband present, and 16.6% were not families. About 13.1% of all households were made up of individuals, and 4.7% had someone living alone who was 65 or older. The average household size was 2.92, and the average family size was 3.21.

In the city, the age distribution was 28.9% under 18, 6.0% from 18 to 24, 27.3% from 25 to 44, 28.5% from 45 to 64, and 9.3% who were 65 or older. The median age was 40 years. For every 100 females, there were 97.3 males. For every 100 females 18 and over, there were 95.8 males.

The median income for a household in the city was $75,528, and for a family was $95,686. Males had a median income of $62,500 versus $30,978 for females. The per capita income for the city was $41,458. About 0.8% of families and 1.8% of the population were below the poverty line, including 2.6% of those under age 18 and 2.0% of those age 65 or over.

Politics

Dalworthington Gardens is a largely Republican jurisdiction in modern times, having supported the GOP in the last six presidential elections.

Education

Public education
Dalworthington Gardens lies within the Arlington Independent School District. Dalworthington Gardens is served by Key Elementary School, Gunn Junior High School, Martin High School, and Arlington High School.

In Texas, school district boundaries do not always follow city and county boundaries because all aspects of the school district government apparatus, including school district boundaries, are independent from the city and county government. In the case of Dalworthington Gardens, no independent school district was ever established. The proximity of the already established Arlington ISD led to the entirety of Dalworthington Gardens being served by the AISD since the middle of the 20th century.

Colleges and universities
No colleges or universities are located in this community, but the town lies in proximity to the University of Texas at Arlington. The community is also served by the Tarrant County College district of junior colleges, which has campuses located in some surrounding cities.

References

External links

 City of Dalworthington Gardens official website
 Arlington Independent School District
 Texas State Historical Association
 City-Data.com
 ePodunk: Profile for Dalworthington Gardens, Texas

Dallas–Fort Worth metroplex
Cities in Texas
Cities in Tarrant County, Texas
New Deal subsistence homestead communities
Populated places established in 1934
1934 establishments in Texas